I See You is a song written by Californian electronic band Jutty Ranx and released in 2012 as the lead single from their debut studio album Jutty Ranx (2013). The song peaked at number 3 in the Italian chart in 2013. A music video for the song was released on YouTube on 2 November 2012 by Spinnin' Records.

Music video
The official music video was released on the Spinnin' Records YouTube channel on 2 November 2012. It lasts for three minutes and forty-three seconds.
The video was filmed in stop motion and shows Jutty Ranx singer Justin Taylor singing the song while post-it and other objects move around him.

References

2012 songs